(born Osaka, Japan) is a former rugby union footballer who played for Japan. 
Playing at flanker and as hooker, Kaneshiro played for Toyota Verblitz and had a cap for Japan against Argentina in Buenos Aires on 22 May 1993, being his only international test cap.  He mostly played for Toyota Verblitz from 1991 - since he graduated from university - until his retirement in 2000.

References

External links
Hideo Kaneshiro international statistics at ESPN Scrum

Date of birth missing (living people)
Living people
Japanese rugby union players
Rugby union flankers
Rugby union hookers
Toyota Verblitz players
Japan international rugby sevens players
Osaka University of Health and Sport Sciences alumni
Year of birth missing (living people)
Japan international rugby union players